Carlos Payán Velver (2 February 1929 – 17 March 2023) was a Mexican writer, journalist and politician. He was a senator from 1997 to 2000, elected by the proportional representation mechanism for the Party of the Democratic Revolution (PRD). He was the founder of La Jornada.

In 2018, the Senate awarded him its Belisario Domínguez Medal of Honour for his "unwavering defence of free expression and human rights".

References

1929 births
2023 deaths
Mexican writers
Mexican journalists
Writers from Mexico City
Politicians from Mexico City
Party of the Democratic Revolution politicians
Members of the Senate of the Republic (Mexico)
20th-century Mexican politicians
Recipients of the Belisario Domínguez Medal of Honor